"Another Heart" is a song by Mark Tremonti that was released by FRET12 Records as the debut single from his sophomore solo album Cauterize on March 23, 2015.

Background
Cauterize is the second studio album by Tremonti, a band fronted by Grammy Award-winning Creed and Alter Bridge guitarist Mark Tremonti. In addition to Tremonti, who provides both lead vocals and guitar, the album features rhythm guitarist and backing vocalist Eric Friedman and drummer Garrett Whitlock. It is the first Tremonti album to feature Wolfgang Van Halen, who replaced Brian Marshall as the band's bassist after the release of the band's first album, All I Was, in 2012. Cauterize is set for release on June 9, 2015.

Track listing
 "Another Heart" – 4:15

Personnel
Musicians
 Mark Tremonti – Lead Vocals, Lead and Rhythm guitar
 Eric Friedman – Rhythm Guitar, Backing Vocals
 Wolfgang Van Halen - Bass, Backing Vocals
 Garrett Whitlock – Drums

Production
 Michael Baskette – producer

References

https://twitter.com/tremontiproject/status/580025420260749312

External links
 Official Mark Tremonti website

2015 singles
Songs written by Mark Tremonti
Mark Tremonti songs
2015 songs
Song recordings produced by Michael Baskette